This page details awards won by the Los Angeles Rams American football team. The Rams were formerly based in St. Louis (1995–2015) and Cleveland (1936–1942, 1944–1945), as well as Los Angeles (1946–1994, 2016–present).

Individual league awards

Coach of the Year: (6)
1945: Adam Walsh
1952: Hamp Pool 
1967: George Allen
1973: Chuck Knox
1999: Dick Vermeil
2017:  Sean McVay

Most Valuable Player: (6)
1939: Parker Hall HB
1945: Bob Waterfield QB
1969: Roman Gabriel QB
1999: Kurt Warner QB 
2000: Marshall Faulk RB
2001: Kurt Warner QB

Defensive Rookie of the Year: (3)
1962: Merlin Olsen DT
1971: Isiah Robertson LB 
2014: Aaron Donald DT

Offensive Rookie of the Year: (4)
1983: Eric Dickerson RB
1993: Jerome Bettis RB
2010: Sam Bradford QB
2015: Todd Gurley RB

Defensive Player of the Year: (4)
1967: Deacon Jones DE NEA
1968: Deacon Jones DE, NEA 
1975: Jack Youngblood DE, UPI, 
2013: Robert Quinn DE, PFWA
2017: Aaron Donald DT, AP
2018: Aaron Donald DT, AP, PFWA, SN
2020: Aaron Donald DT, AP, PFWA, SN

Offensive Player of the Year: (4)
1986: Eric Dickerson RB
1999: Marshall Faulk RB  
2000: Marshall Faulk RB  
2001: Marshall Faulk RB
2017: Todd Gurley RB 
2021: Cooper Kupp WR

Man of the Year Award: (1)
2021: Andrew Whitworth LT

Pete Rozelle Trophy (Super Bowl MVP): (2)

2000: Kurt Warner QB (XXXIV)

2022: Cooper Kupp WR (LVI)

Team award
1945 – Ed Thorp Memorial Trophy (NFL Champion)
1951 – Ed Thorp Memorial Trophy (NFL Champion)
1979 – George Halas Trophy (NFC Champion)
1999 – George Halas Trophy (NFC Champion)
1999 – Vince Lombardi Trophy (Super Bowl XXXIV)
2001 – George Halas Trophy (NFC Champion)
2018 – George Halas Trophy (NFC Champion)
2021 – George Halas Trophy (NFC Champion)
2021 – Vince Lombardi Trophy (Super Bowl LVI)

Individual team awards

Ed Block Courage Award

1984 Jack Youngblood
1985 Mike Guman
1986 Doug Smith
1987 Charles White
1988 Vince Newsome
1989 Mark Jerue
1990 Jerry Gray
1991 Michael Stewart
1992 Jackie Slater
1993 David Lang
1994 Roman Phifer
1995 Ron Wolfley
1996 Alexander Wright
1997 Mark Rypien
1998 Mike Jones
1999 Ernie Conwell
2000 Trent Green
2001 Isaac Bruce
2002 Andy McCollum
2003 Aeneas Williams

2004 Marshall Faulk
2005 Leonard Little
2006 Pisa Tinoisamoa
2007 Dane Looker
2008 Orlando Pace
2009 James Hall
2010 Bradley Fletcher
2011 Brit Miller
2012 Danny Amendola
2013 Lance Kendricks
2014 Scott Wells
2015 Brian Quick
2016 Alec Ogletree
2017 Darrell Williams
2018 Sam Shields
2019 Cooper Kupp
2020 Rob Havenstein
2021 Justin Lawler
2022 Jordan Fuller

Daniel F. Reeves Memorial Award
The Daniel F. Reeves Memorial Award is given to the Rams most valuable player of the year as determined by the players and coaches. It is named after Dan Reeves, the owner of the Rams from 1941 until 1971. 

1969 Roman Gabriel
1970 Merlin Olsen
1971 Marlin McKeever
1972 Merlin Olsen
1973 John Hadl
1974 Lawrence McCutcheon
1975 Jack Youngblood
1976 Jack Youngblood
1977 Lawrence McCutcheon
1978 Jim Youngblood
1979 Jack Youngblood
1980 Vince Ferragamo
1981 Nolan Cromwell
1982 Vince Ferragamo
1983 Eric Dickerson
1984 Eric Dickerson
1985 LeRoy Irvin
1986 Eric Dickerson
1987 Charles White
1988 Henry Ellard
1989 Jim Everett
1990 Buford McGee
1991 Robert Delpino
1992 Jackie Slater
1993 Jerome Bettis
1994 Shane Conlan
1995 Isaac Bruce
1996 Isaac Bruce

1997 Amp Lee
1998 Kevin Carter
1999 Marshall Faulk
2000 Marshall Faulk
2001 Marshall Faulk
2002 Marc Bulger
2003 Torry Holt
2004 Marc Bulger
2005 Torry Holt
2006 Steven Jackson
2007 Will Witherspoon
2008 Oshiomogho Atogwe
2009 Steven Jackson
2010 Steven Jackson
2011 Steven Jackson
2012 Steven Jackson
2013 Robert Quinn
2014 Robert Quinn
2015 Aaron Donald
2016 Aaron Donald
2017 Todd Gurley
2018 Aaron Donald
2019 Aaron Donald
2020 Aaron Donald
2021 Cooper Kupp
2022 Bobby Wagner

Carroll Rosenbloom Memorial Award
The Carroll Rosenbloom Memorial Award is given to the Rams rookie of the year as determined by the players and coaches. The reward is named after the former owner of the Rams. Rosenbloom was the owner of the Rams from 1972 until 1978.

 1979 Kent Hill
 1980 Johnnie Johnson
 1981 Jairo Penaranda
 1982 Barry Redden
 1983 Eric Dickerson
 1984 Ron Brown
 1985 Dale Hatcher
 1986 Jim Everett
 1987 Cliff Hicks
 1988 Robert Delpino
 1989 Darryl Henley
 1990 Bern Brostek
 1991 Todd Lyght
 1992 Sean Gilbert
 1993 Jerome Bettis
 1994 Isaac Bruce
 1995 Kevin Carter
 1996 Eddie Kennison
 1997 David Thompson
 1998 London Fletcher
 1999 Torry Holt
 2000 Matt Bowen

 2001 Tommy Polley
 2002 Travis Fisher
 2003 Pisa Tinoisamoa
 2004 Steven Jackson
 2005 Alex Barron
 2006 Tye Hill
 2007 Adam Carriker
 2008 Donnie Avery
 2009 James Laurinaitis
 2010 Sam Bradford
 2011 Robert Quinn
 2012 Janoris Jenkins
 2013 Zac Stacy
 2014 Aaron Donald
 2015 Todd Gurley
 2016 Cory Littleton
 2017 Cooper Kupp
 2018 John Franklin-Myers
 2019 Taylor Rapp
 2020 Jordan Fuller
 2021  Ernest Jones
 2022 Cobie Durant

Carl Ekern Spirit Of The Game Award

1991 Buford McGee, FB
1992 Darryl Henley, CB
1993 Tim Lester, FB
1994 Jackie Slater, T
1995 D'Marco Farr, DT
1996 Harold Green, RB
1997 Mike A. Jones, LB
1998 Mike A. Jones, LB
1999 Mike A. Jones, LB
2000 Ray Agnew, DT
2001 Aeneas Williams, CB
2002 Ernie Conwell, TE
2003 Aeneas Williams, S
2004 Pisa Tinoisamoa, LB
2005 Pisa Tinoisamoa, LB

2006 Corey Chavous, S
2007 Corey Chavous, S
2008 Corey Chavous, S
2009 Leonard Little DE
2010 Oshiomogho Atogwe S
2011 James Laurinaitis, MLB
2012 Steven Jackson, RB
2013 James Laurinaitis, LB
2014 Cory Harkey, FB
2015 Cory Harkey, FB
2016 Cory Harkey, FB
2017 Andrew Whitworth, OT
2018 Andrew Whitworth, OT
2019 Eric Weddle, S
2020 Andrew Whitworth, OT
2021
2022 Rob Havenstein

Ye Olde Rams Awards
Ye Olde Rams is now known as the Rams Alumni. From 1952 to the present, they vote on position awards for the Los Angeles Rams. The MVP and Rookie of the Year Awards were discontinued because the current players began voting on those two awards. Ye Olde Rams were run by former Rams George Struger and now operate under Los Angeles Rams Alumni relations manager Lori Fabien.

Most Valuable Player
The Ye Olde Rams Most Valuable player is given to the Rams most valuable player of the year as determined by the Los Angeles Rams Alumni. The award differs from the Reeves Awards, voted on by current Rams players.

1960 Les Richter
1961 Jim Phillips
1962 Dick Bass
1963 Roman Gabriel
1964 Eddie Meador
1965 Eddie Meador
1966 Dick Bass
1967 Roman Gabriel
1968 Deacon Jones
1969 Roman Gabriel
1970 Merlin Olsen

1971 Roman Gabriel
1972 Merlin Olsen
1973 John Hadl
1974 James Harris
1975 Jack Youngblood
1976 Jack Youngblood
1977 Pat Haden
1978 Jim Youngblood & Jack Reynolds
1979 Jack Youngblood
1980 Vince Ferragamo

Outstanding Rookie
1952—Bob Carey; 1953—Frank Fuller; 1954—Les Richter; 1955—Don Burroughs; 1956—Hugh Pitts; 1957—Jon Arnett; 1958—Lou Michaels; 1959—John LoVetere; 1960—Charley Britt; 1961—David Jones; 1962—Merlin Olsen; 1963—Don Chuy; 1964—Bill Munson; 1965—Jack Snow; 1966—Tom Mack; 1967—Willie Ellison; 1968—Mike Dennis; 1969—Larry Smith; 1970—Rich Saul; 1971—Isiah Robertson; 1972—Jim Bertelsen; 1973—Eddie McMillan; 1974—John Cappelletti; 1975—Monte Jackson; 1976—Pat Haden; 1977—Billy Waddy; 1978—Frank Corral; 1979—Kent Hill; 1980—Johnnie Johnson.

Outstanding Lineman
Award included both offensive and defensive "linemen" until separate awards; (O)—Offense; (D)—Defense; emerged in 1960. Offense ends i.e. Tom Fears, were considered linemen. Additionally, linebackers could be considered "non backs" and therefore linemen.  
1951—Jim Winkler; 1952—Andy Robustelli; 1953—Andy Robustelli; 1954—Tom Fears; 1955—Bud McFadin; 1956—Bud McFadin; 1957—Duane Putnam; 1958—Del Shofner; 1959—Bob Fry; 1960—Jim Phillips (O), John LoVetere (D); 1961—Frank Varrichione (O), Lamar Lundy (D);  1962—Frank Varrichione (O), Deacon Jones (D); 1963—Frank Varrichione (O), Jack Pardee (D); 1964—Marlin McKeever (O), Deacon Jones (D); 1965—Tommy McDonald (O), Deacon Jones (D); 1966—Charlie Cowan (O), Deacon Jones (D); 1967—Joe Scibelli  (O), Merlin Olsen (D); 1968—Joe Scibelli (O), Merlin Olsen (D); 1969—Ken Iman (O), Merlin Olsen (D) 1970—Tom Mack (O), Merlin Olsen (D); 1971—Joe Scibelli (O), Coy Bacon (D); 1972—Joe Scibelli (O), Coy Bacon (D); 1973—Joe Scibelli (O). Jack Youngblood (D); 1974—Charlie Cowan (O), Fred Dryer (D); 1975—Tom Mack (O), Jack Youngblood (D); 1976—Rich Saul (O), Jack Youngblood (D); 1977—Tom Mack (O), Larry Brooks (D); 1978—Tom Mack (O), Jack Youngblood (D); 1979—Rich Saul (O), Jack Youngblood (D); 1980—Rich Saul (O), Jack Youngblood (D); 1981—Rich Saul (O), Jack Youngblood (D); 1982—Kent Hill (O), Jack Youngblood (D); 1983—Jackie Slater (O), Jack Youngblood (D); 1984—Bill Bain (O), Jack Youngblood (D); 1985—Dennis Harrah (O), Gary Jeter (D); 1986—Jackie Slater (O), Gary Jeter (D); 1987—Jackie Slater (O), Gary Jeter (D); 1988—Tom Newberry (O), Gary Jeter (D).; 1989—Tom Newberry (O), Kevin Greene (D); 1990—Jackie Slater (O), Kevin Greene (D); 1991—Tom Newberry  (O), Kevin Greene (D); 1992—Gerald Perry (O), Sean Gilbert (D); 1993—Bern Brostek  (O), Sean Gilbert (D); 1994—Tom Newberry (O), Robert Young (D); 1995—Wayne Gandy (O), D'Marco Farr (D); 1996—Bern Brostek  (O), Kevin Carter (D); 1997—Wayne Gandy  (O), Bill Johnson (D); 1998—Wayne Gandy  (O), Kevin Carter (D); 1999—Orlando Pace (O), Kevin Carter (D); 2000—Orlando Pace (O), Grant Wistrom (D); 2001—Orlando Pace (O), Grant Wistrom (D); 2002—Adam Timmerman (O), Leonard Little (D); 2002—Adam Timmerman (O), Leonard Little (D); 2003—Orlando Pace (O), Leonard Little (D); 2004— Orlando Pace (O), Leonard Little (D); 2005— Orlando Pace (O), Leonard Little (D); 2006—Adam Timmerman (O), Leonard Little (D); 2007—Alex Barron  (O), La'Roi Glover (D); 2008—Richie Incognito (O), James Hall (D); 2009—Jason Brown (O), Chris Long (D); 2010—Rodger Saffold (O), Chris Long (D); 2011—Harvey Dahl (O), Chris Long (D); 2012—Harvey Dahl (O), Chris Long (D); 2013-Jake Long (O); Robert Quinn (D); 2014-Rodger Saffold (O); Robert Quinn (D);  2015-Rob Havenstein (O); Aaron Donald (D); 2016-Rodger Saffold (O);Aaron Donald (D) 2017-Rodger Saffold (O);Aaron Donald (D); 2018-Rob Havenstein (O); Aaron Donald (D); 2019-Andrew Whitworth (O); Aaron Donald (D); 2020-Rob Havenstein (O); Aaron Donald (D); 2021-Brian Allen (O); Aaron Donald (D)

Outstanding receiver
Created in 1967 to honor receivers only (ends and tight ends)
1967—Jack Snow; 1968—Bernie Casey; 1969—Billy Truax;  1970—Jack Snow; 1971 —Lance Rentzel; 1972—Jack Snow; 1973—Harold Jackson; 1974—Bob Klein; 1975—Ron Jessie;  1976—Ron Jessie; 1977—Terry Nelson; 1978—Ron Jessie; 1979—Preston Dennard; 1980—Preston Dennard, 1981—Preston Dennard; 1982—Preston Dennard; 1983—Mike Barber; 1984—Henry Ellard; 1985—Henry Ellard; 1986—Henry Ellard; 1987—Henry Ellard; 1988—Henry Ellard; 1989—Flipper Anderson; 1990—Henry Ellard; 1991—Henry Ellard; 1992—Flipper Anderson; 1993—Henry Ellard; 1994—Troy Drayton; 1995—Isaac Bruce; 1996—Isaac Bruce; 1997—Ernie Conwell; 1998—Ricky Proehl; 1999—Isaac Bruce; 2000—Isaac Bruce; 2001—Isaac Bruce & Torry Holt; 2002—Isaac Bruce; 2003—Torry Holt; 2004—Isaac Bruce & Torry Holt; 2005—Torry Holt; 2006—Torry Holt; 2007—Torry Holt; 2008—Torry Holt; 2009—Brandon Gibson; 2010—Brandon Gibson; 2011—Brandon Gibson; 2012—Danny Amendola; 2013- Tavon Austin; 2014- Kenny Britt; 2015-Tavon Austin; 2016- Kenny Britt; 2017- Sammy Watkins; 2018-Robert Woods; 2019-Cooper Kupp; 2020-Cooper Kupp; 2021-Cooper Kupp

Outstanding back
In 1960 separate awards emerged for both offensive and defensive backs. Linebackers were, at times, eligible for this award.
1951—Dan Towler; 1952—Paul Younger; 1953—Skeets Quinlan; 1954—Paul Younger; 1955—Ron Waller; 1956—Paul Younger; 1957—Tom Wilson; 1958—Jon Arnett; 1959—Jon Arnett; 1960—Jon Arnett (O), Eddie Meador (D); 1961—Dick Bass (O), Ed Meador (D); 1962—Dick Bass (O), Marlin McKeever (D); 1963—Dick Bass (O), Ed Meador (D); 1964-Les Josephson (O), Ed Meador (D); 1965—Dick Bass  (O), Ed Meador (D); 1966—Dick Bass (O), Maxie Baughan (D); 1967—Les Josephson (O), Ed Meador (D); 1968—Roman Gabriel (O), Jack Pardee (D);  1969—Les Josephson  (O), Ed Meador (D); 1970—Les Josephson (O), Jack Pardee (D); 1971—Willie Ellison (O), Marlin McKeever (D); 1972—Willie Ellison (O), Marlin McKeever (D); 1973—Lawrence McCutcheon (O),  Dave Elmendorf (D); 1974—Lawrence McCutcheon (O), Dave Elmendorf (D); 1975—Lawrence McCutcheon  (O), Bill Simpson  (D); 1976—Lawrence McCutcheon (O), Monte Jackson (D); 1977—Lawrence McCutcheon (O), Bill Simpson (D); 1978—John Cappelletti (O), Pat Thomas (D); 1979—Wendell Tyler (O), Jim Youngblood (D); 1980—Vince Ferragamo (O), Nolan Cromwell (D); 1981—Wendell Tyler (O), Rod Perry (D); 1982—Wendell Tyler (O), Nolan Cromwell (D); 1983—Eric Dickerson (O), Johnnie Johnson (D); 1984—Eric Dickerson (O), Jim Collins (D); 1985—Eric Dickerson (O), LeRoy Irvin (D); 1986—Eric Dickerson (O), LeRoy Irvin (D); 1987—Charles White (O), Jerry Gray (D); 1988—Greg Bell (O), LeRoy Irvin (D); 1989—Greg Bell  (O), Jerry Gray (D); 1990—Jim Everett (O), Vince Newsome (D); 1991—Robert Delpino (O), Michael Stewart (D); 1992—Cleveland Gary (O), Anthony Newman(D); 1993—Jerome Bettis (O), Roman Phifer (D); 1994—Jerome Bettis (O), Roman Phifer (D); 1995—Jerome Bettis (O), Toby Wright (D);  1996—Harold Green  (O), Keith Lyle (D);  1997—Amp Lee (O), Roman Phifer (D); 1998—Tony Banks  (O), Roman Phifer (D); 1999—Kurt Warner (O), Todd Lyght (D); 2000—Marshall Faulk (O), Dexter McCleon (D); 2001—Marshall Faulk (O), Aeneas Williams (D); 2002—Marshall Faulk (O), Dre' Bly (D); 2003—Marshall Faulk (O), Aeneas Williams (D); 2004—Marc Bulger  (O), Jerametrius Butler (D); 2005—Steven Jackson (O), Adam Archuleta (D); 2006—Steven Jackson (O), Oshiomogho Atogwe (D); 2007—Steven Jackson (O), Will Witherspoon  (D); 2008—Steven Jackson (O), Oshiomogho Atogwe  (D); 2009—Steven Jackson (O), Oshiomogho Atogwe  (D);2010—Sam Bradford (O), Oshiomogho Atogwe  (D); 2011—Steven Jackson (O), James Laurinaitis (D); (D); 2012—Sam Bradford (O), Cortland Finnegan (D); 2013- Zac Stacy (O); Janoris Jenkins (D); 2014- Tre Mason (O); Alec Ogletree (D); 2015- Todd Gurley (O); Trumaine Johnson; 2016- Todd Gurley (O); Alec Ogletree (D); 2017- Todd Gurley (O); Lamarcus Joyner (D); 2018- Todd Gurley (O); John Johnson III (D); 2019- Todd Gurley (O); Jalen Ramsey (D); 2020- Cam Akers (O); Jalen Ramsey (D); 2021- Matthew Stafford (O); Jalen Ramsey (D)

Outstanding Special Teams player
1969—Alvin Haymond 1970—Avlin Haymond; 1971—Alvin Haymond; 1972—Dave Chapple; 1973—David Ray; 1974—Jim Youngblood; 1975—Tom Dempsey; 1976—Cullen Bryant; 1977—Jim Jodat; 1978—Frank Corral; 1979—Ivory Sully; 1980—Ivory Sully; 1981—LeRoy Irvin; 1982—Ivory Sully; 1983—Ivory Sully; 1984—Norwood Vann and Ivory Sully; 1985—Dale Hatcher & Ron Brown;  1986—Vince Newsome; 1987—Ron Brown; 1988—Robert Delpino; 1989— Mike Lansford; 1990—Pat Terrell; 1991—Paul Butcher; 1992—Todd Kinchen; 1993—Thomas Homco; 1994—Todd Kinchen; 1995—Cedric Figaro; 1996—Todd Kinchen; 1997—Jeff Robinson; 1998—London Fletcher; 1999—Tony Horne; 2000—Az-Zahir Hakim; 2001—Jeff Wilkins; 2002— Nick Sorensen; 2003—Jeff Wilkins; 2004—Trev Faulk; 2005—Madison Hedgecock; 2006—Jeff Wilkins; 2007—Dante Hall; 2008—Donnie Jones; 2009—Donnie Jones & Chris Chamberlain;  2010—Danny Amendola; 2011—Dominique Curry; 2012—Greg Zuerlein; 2013-Johnny Hekker; 2014-Johnny Hekker; 2015-Johnny Hekker; 2016-Johnny Hekker; 2017—Greg Zuerlein; 2018-Cory Littleton; 2019-Johnny Hekker; 2020-Johnny Hekker; 2021-Matt Gay

NEA Third Down Trophy
The Rams MVP as determined by the Newspaper Enterprise Association, which gave the award beginning with the American Football League in 1960 and with the National Football League in 1970 and continued through 1979.
1970—Merlin Olsen; 1971—Willie Ellison; 1972—Ken Iman; 1973—John Hadl; 1974—Lawrence McCutcheon; 1975—Harold Jackson; 1976—Lawrence McCutcheon; 1977—Pat Haden; 1978—Jack Reynolds; 1979—Jim Youngblood

Other achievements

Pro Football Hall of Famers
Former Rams in the Pro Football Hall of Fame include Joe Namath (12), Ollie Matson (33), Andy Robustelli (84), Dick "Night Train" Lane (81), coach Earl "Dutch" Clark, and general manager Tex Schramm. GM and later NFL Commissioner Pete Rozelle and coach Sid Gillman are also members of the Hall of Fame, but were elected on the basis of their performances with other teams or (in the case of Rozelle) NFL administration.

St. Louis Football Ring of Fame
Former Rams were included in the former Ring Of Fame in the Dome at America's Center. All players included were Hall of Famers, but there have been a few exceptions for team executives and coaches.

Retired numbers

Numbers that have been retired by the Rams. 
 7 Bob Waterfield
 28 Marshall Faulk
 29 Eric Dickerson
 74 Merlin Olsen
 75 Deacon Jones
 78 Jackie Slater
 80 Isaac Bruce
 85 Jack Youngblood

Los Angeles Rams 40th Anniversary Team
Chosen by a fan vote of the Los Angeles Times in 1985.

St. Louis Rams 10th Anniversary Team
Chosen by a fan vote in 2005.

Rams 75th Anniversary Team
Chosen by stadium fan vote, 2012.

CSVA Sports Film and Video Hall of Famers

Mickey Dukitch (2011)

Statistical awards

Sacks
Note: Year-by-year sack totals. Sacks became an officially recognized statistic in 1982.

1960— Brito • 7 
1961— Lundy • 11 
1962— Jones • 12 
1963— Lundy • 9 
1964—  Jones • 22 
1965—  Jones • 19 
1966—  Jones • 18 
1967—  Jones • 21 
1968—  Jones • 22 
1969—  Jones • 15   
1970—  Jones • 12 
1971— C. Bacon • 11 
1972—  C. Bacon • 11½ 
1973—  Youngblood • 16½ 
1974— Youngblood • 15  
1975—  Youngblood • 15 
1976— (tie) Youngblood & Brooks • 14½ 
1977—  Youngblood • 8½ 
1978—  Brooks • 8
1979—  Youngblood • 18 

1980—  Youngblood • 11½ 
1981— Youngblood • 12½ 
1982—  Fanning • 5 
1983— Youngblood • 10½ 
1984— Youngblood • 9½ 
1985— Wilcher • 12½ 
1986— Jeter • 8 
1987—  Jeter • 7 
1988— Greene • 16½ 
1989— Greene • 16½ 
1990 — Greene • 13 
1991—  (tie) Greene & Robinson • 3 
1992—  Greene • 10 
1993—  Gilbert • 10½ 
1994—  Young • 6.5½ 
1995—  Farr • 11 
1996—  Carter • 9½ 
1997—  O’Neal • 10 
1998—  Carter • 12  
1999—  Carter • 17 

2000—  Wistrom • 11 
2001—  Little • 14½ 
2002—  Little • 12 
2003—  Little • 12½ 
2004— Fisher • 8½ 
2005— Little • 9½ 
2006—  Little • 13 
2007—  Witherspoon • 7 
2008—  J. Hall • 6½ 
2009—  Little • 6½ 
2010—  J. Hall • 10½ 
2011—  Long • 13 
2012—  Long • 11½ 
2013—  Quinn • 19 
2014—  Quinn • 10½ 
2015—  Donald • 11 
2016—  Donald • 8 
2017—  Donald • 11 
2018—  Donald • 20½

References

Awards
National Football League trophies and awards